Fritz Johansson (27 May 1893 – 19 September 1971) was a Swedish wrestler. He competed in the middleweight event at the 1912 Summer Olympics.

References

External links
 

1893 births
1971 deaths
Olympic wrestlers of Sweden
Wrestlers at the 1912 Summer Olympics
Swedish male sport wrestlers
People from Burlöv Municipality
Sportspeople from Skåne County